Alişan Serkan Tektaş (born Serkan Burak Tektaş; 19 June 1976), better known as Alişan, is a Turkish singer. At high school he recorded his first album. In 1997, his first hit album Sana Birşey Olmasın was released. He was born in Şişhane district of Istanbul. He is originally from Zaza and is from Bingöl. He graduated from Kuvay-ı Milliye primary school, Private Şişli College secondary school, and Private Evrim High School, respectively.

Discography

Albums 
 Derdo – Elazığ'ın Güzelleri (as Serkan Burak) – 1991 (Minerva Müzik)
 Delimisin Ne? (as Serkan Burak) – 1994 (Umut Plak)
 Aşık Oldum – 1996 (Kral Müzik)
 Sana Bir Şey Olmasın – 1997 (Prestij Müzik)
 Var Ya – 1999 (Prestij Müzik)
 Kara Çadır – 2000 (Umut Plak)
 Alişan – 2001 (Prestij Müzik)
 Söz Mü? – 2002 (Popüler Müzik)
 Keje – 2003 (Prestij Müzik)
 Kalbim Ellerinde – 2004 (Akbaş Müzik)
 Olay Bitmiştir – 2005 (Avrupa Müzik)
 Ve Kimselere Güvenmiyorum – 2007 (Erol Köse Production)
 Senfonik Çağdaş İlahiler – 2007 (Erol Köse Production)
 Sevgilerimle – 2008 (Seyhan Müzik)
 10 – 2011 (Kaya Müzik)
 Melekler İmza Topluyor – 2011 (Kaya Müzik)
 Seni Biraz Fazla Sevdim – 2013 (Poll Production)
 İhtiyacı Var – 2014 (Poll Production)

Singles 
 Ölümsüz Aşklar – 2016 (Avrupa Müzik)
 Uslu Dururum – 2017 (Avrupa Müzik)
 Zor Sensiz – 2017 (Avrupa Müzik)
 Milletin Duâsı (with various artists) – 2018 (Poll Production)
 Biliyorum Dönmeyecek – 2018 (Avrupa Müzik)
 İlahi Adalet – 2018 (Avrupa Müzik)
 Yağmurlar (with Furkan Özsan) – 2019 (Avrupa Müzik)

Filmography 
 Aynalı Tahir (Aynalı Tahir) (TV series) (Star TV) – 1998–1999
 Kurt Kapanı (Falçata Kemal) (TV series) (TGRT) – 2000
 Aşkına Eşkıya (Berşan) (TV series) (TGRT, Show TV) – 2001–2002
 Papatya ile Karabiber (Karabiber) (TV film) – 2004
 Cennet Mahallesi (Ferhat) (TV series) (Show TV) – 2004–2007
 Gonca Karanfil (Karanfil Kemal) (TV series) (ATV) – 2008
 Mert İle Gert (Guest appearance-himself) (TV series) (TRT 1) – 2008
 İbret-i Ailem (Guest appearance-himself) (TV series) (Star TV) – 2012
 Güldür Güldür (Guest appearance-himself) (Show TV) – 2014
 Dostlar Mahallesi (Metin) (TV series) (Kanal D) – 2017

Programs 
 Alişan'lı Gece (TGRT) (2003–2004)
 Mavi Ay (ATV) (presented together with Asuman Krause) (2006 - 21 mar 2022)
 Daha Ne Olsun (FOX) (presented together with Demet Akalın) (2007)
 İlle de Roman Olsun (Show TV) (presented together with Çağla Şıkel) (2008–2009 - 22 mar 2022)
 Herşey Dahil (Show TV) (presented together with Çağla Şıkel) (2009 - 19 mar 2022)
 Tabu (FOX) (presented together with Çağla Şıkel) (2011)
 Ayşe&Alişan (Star TV) (presented together with Ayşe Özyılmazel) (2012 - 23 mar 2022)
 Alişan&Sevcan (Star TV) (presented together with Ayşe Özyılmazel and then with Sevcan Orhan) (2012–2013 - 25 mar 2022)
 Herşey Dahil (Show TV) (presented together with Çağla Şıkel) (2013–2015 - 24 mar 2022) 
 Herşey Dahil (Kanal 360) (2016–2017 - 20 mar 2022) (presented together with Çağla Şıkel)
 Ailecek Şanslıyız (TV8) (2019–)
 Demet ve Alişan'la Sabah Sabah (Star TV) (2020–) (presented together with Demet Akalın)

References 

1976 births
Living people
People from Beyoğlu
Turkish folk-pop singers
Turkish pop singers
21st-century Turkish singers
21st-century Turkish male singers
Turkish male television actors
Turkish male film actors
Turkish singers by voice type